Open access to scholarly communication in Germany has evolved rapidly since the early 2000s. Publishers Beilstein-Institut, Copernicus Publications, De Gruyter, Knowledge Unlatched, Leibniz Institute for Psychology Information, ScienceOpen, Springer Nature, and  belong to the international Open Access Scholarly Publishers Association.

Policy
The legal basis for authors choosing open access publishing lies in Section 12 of the German  (Copyright Act), which covers Urheberrecht (authors' rights).

All major German research institutions have signed the 2003 Berlin Declaration on Open Access to Knowledge in the Sciences and Humanities, including the Berlin-Brandenburg Academy of Sciences and Humanities, Deutsche Forschungsgemeinschaft, Fraunhofer Society, German Rectors' Conference, and Max Planck Society.

"The Federal Ministry of Education and Research released its open access strategy paper entitled "Open Access in Germany" on September 20, 2016, which contains a clear commitment to the principles of open access and open science.

Journals
Open access journals can be found on digital platforms such as Copernicus Publications (headquartered in Göttingen), and Living Reviews.

Repositories

There are a number of collections of scholarship in Germany housed in digital open access repositories. They contain journal articles, book chapters, data, and other research outputs that are free to read. As of March 2018 some 161 institutions in Germany maintain repositories, according to the UK-based Directory of Open Access Repositories.

Listings of German repositories can be found in the Germany-based registries Bielefeld Academic Search Engine (BASE) and Deutsche Initiative für Netzwerkinformation (DINI), and in international registries Directory of Open Access Repositories (OpenDOAR), Registry of Open Access Repositories (ROAR), and Open Archives Initiative's OAI-PMH Registered Data Providers. Experts consider BASE the most comprehensive registry for Germany.

In 2012, German repositories with the highest number of digital assets were Deutsches Zentrum für Luft- und Raumfahrt's elib (46,136 items); ZBW – Leibniz-Informationszentrum Wirtschaft's EconStor (212,000 items); German Medical Science (41,753 items); Universität Bielefeld's PUB (32,695 items); and Alfred-Wegener-Institut's ePIC (29,480 items). "Most of Germany's open access repositories can be found in the most heavily populated Länder: North Rhine-Westphalia (27), Baden-Württemberg (28) and Bavaria (22)."

The upcoming 2019 "International Conference on Open Repositories" will be held in Hamburg.

Conferences and outreach
Since the initial Berlin conference in 2003, follow-up conferences occur every year, often in Germany.

"Open-Access-Tage" (Open Access Days) have occurred annually since 2007 in various German-speaking locales, including Berlin, Dresden, Göttingen, Hamburg, Köln, Konstanz, Munich, Regensburg. The 2018 event will be held in Graz, Austria.

In 2007 several German institutions launched the general information website, "Open-access.net". The  in 2008 initiated an effort to expand open access in order to "exhaust the potential of digital publishing."

Bielefeld University Library hosts the "Transparent Infrastructure for Article Charges" project, which covers article processing charges for publications of Germany and elsewhere. The project began around 2014.

Timeline
Key events in the development of open access in Germany include the following:
 2001
 16 March: German Wikipedia, a German-language open educational resource, begins publication.
 2003
 Berlin Declaration on Open Access to Knowledge in the Sciences and Humanities issued.
 2004
 Bielefeld Academic Search Engine launched.
  (Coalition for Action "Copyright for Education and Research") formed.
 2005
 Bielefeld University begins its open access policy encouraging deposits in its institutional repository.
 2006
 Deutsche Forschungsgemeinschaft adopts open access policy for its grantees.
 2007
 Open-access.net launched.
 "Open-Access-Tage" (Open Access Days) begin.
 2008
 Allianz der Wissenschaftsorganisationen's Schwerpunktinitiative "Digitale Information" (Priority Initiative "Digital Information") begins.
 2010
 Confederation of Open Access Repositories headquartered in Göttingen.
 2011
 Deutsche Forschungsgemeinschaft begins "to support centrally funded publication fees through its 'Open-Access Publishing' programme."
 2012
 Deutsche Initiative für Netzwerkinformation (DINI) begins.
 2013
 Registry of Research Data Repositories headquartered in Germany.
 2014
 "Transparent Infrastructure for Article Charges" project begins (approximate date).
 2015
 Berlin-based Springer Nature, "the world’s second largest academic publisher," in business. As of 2018 "open-access journals generate roughly 10 per cent of Springer Nature’s research revenues."

See also
 Internet in Germany
 Education in Germany
 Media of Germany
 Copyright law of Germany
 List of libraries in Germany
 Science and technology in Germany
 Open access in other countries

References

Further reading

 
 
 
  (2013 version )

External links
 
 
 
 
 
 

Academia in Germany
Communications in Germany
Germany
Science and technology in Germany